Pine squirrels are squirrels of the genus Tamiasciurus, in the Sciurini tribe, of the large family Sciuridae.

Species
This genus includes three species: 
Tamiasciurus douglasii — Douglas squirrel
T. d. mearnsi — Mearns's squirrel 
Tamiasciurus fremonti — southwestern red squirrel
T. f. grahamensis — Mount Graham red squirrel
Tamiasciurus hudsonicus — American red squirrel  
All three species are native to North America. Pine squirrels can be found in the northern and western United States, most of Canada, Alaska, and northwestern Mexico.

Description 
Pine squirrels, Tamiasciurus species, are small tree squirrels with bushy tails. Along with members of the genus Sciurus, they are members of the Sciurini tribe.

The name Tamiasciurus comes from the Greek "Ταμίας" "Σκίουρος" for "hoarder squirrel".

The American red squirrel should not be confused with the Eurasian red squirrel (Sciurus vulgaris) — both are usually just referred to as the "red squirrel" in their home continents.

Pine squirrels rely on a variety of food sources including fungi, plants, arthropods and tree seed.

References

External links

Tamiasciurus
Mammals of Canada
Mammals of the United States